Marco Cattaneo (born 28 October 1957) is an Italian former cyclist. He competed in the individual road race event at the 1980 Summer Olympics.

References

External links
 

1957 births
Living people
Italian male cyclists
Olympic cyclists of Italy
Cyclists at the 1980 Summer Olympics
Cyclists from the Province of Como